The Fall of Saul is an epic poem by John Gunning Seymer. It was first published in London in 1839 by Stewart and Murray. The story is based on the Bible. The main hero is the king of Israel, Saul. The poem is written in blank verse that is unrhymed iambic pentameter. The tale is divided in six books.

References

Bibliography 
 John Gunning Seymer, The Fall of Saul. A Sacred Epic Poem, Stewart and Murray, London 1839.

Epic poems in English
English poems
1839 poems